"Same Song" is a 1991 song by Digital Underground.

Same Song or The Same Song may also refer to:
The Same Song, a program of the China Central Television music channel 
"Same Song", a song by Llama Farmers, 2000
"Same Song", a song by LaKisha Jones from So Glad I'm Me
The Same Song, an album by Israel Vibration, 1978
"The Same Song", a song by Alton Ellis from Cry Tough